Memory Alpha is a wiki encyclopedia for topics related to the Star Trek fictional universe. Conceived by Harry Doddema and Dan Carlson in September 2003 and officially launched on December 5 of that year, it uses the wiki model and is hosted by Fandom on the MediaWiki software. Doddema and Carlson retired from Memory Alpha in 2008 and 2005 respectively. Memory Alpha contains over 51,000 articles and 56,000 images in its English edition alone , making it one of the largest wiki projects. The site is also available in several other languages, including Bulgarian, Catalan, Chinese, Czech, Dutch, Esperanto, French, German, Italian, Japanese, Polish, Portuguese, Russian, Serbian, Spanish, and Swedish.

History
Memory Alpha aims to create a comprehensive database for all fans, but was not conceived as a wiki. Two concerns spurred its creation in 2003: many Star Trek references sources on the internet were incomplete, and the most promising often shut down. Doddema and Carlson christened their project Memory Alpha, after the Federation's largest information archive, from the original series episode "The Lights of Zetar".

The two decided on a wiki format, which allowed for more collaboration than other formats available. As Carlson said in the Charlotte Observer, "The idea I latched onto with the wiki concept is you can spread the work around. Everyone can pitch in and go in on their own special interest." After experimenting with TikiWiki software, they switched to the MediaWiki platform, finding it less cumbersome. The platform of choice for Wikimedia Foundation projects proved to be, in their opinion, more stable and efficient, and they brought a testsite online on November 11, 2003. Memory Alpha officially launched on December 5, 2003.

The site gained momentum in the following months, aided by a mention on the Star Trek fan site "TrekNation" on December 23. Memory Alpha reached 1,000 articles by January 12, 2004, but on March 23, the site's database was accidentally erased during an upgrade of the MediaWiki software. Although this caused six weeks of work to be lost, the project expanded to include Dutch and German versions on April 10 and May 14 respectively. It remained stable until the following year, when the fees associated with hosting the site became more than the founders could afford.

In February 2005, Memory Alpha switched hosting servers and joined Wikia (now known as Fandom), a free for-profit wiki-hosting company started by Wikimedia Foundation board members Jimmy Wales and Angela Beesley. The site remained stable on Wikia, opening a Swedish site on May 5 and a French one on November 5. It also received several distinctions that year, such as the Ex Astris Excellentia award from Ex Astris Scientia, a Star Trek reference site, in September 2005, and it was featured as the Sci-Fi Channel's Site of the Week for October 10, 2005. Star Trek: Voyager and Star Trek: Enterprise writer/producer Mike Sussman joined the community that year as well.

Technical issues led the MediaWiki software to believe Memory Alpha was started on November 23, 2004, and despite the inaccuracy, this date was adopted ex post facto as Memory Alpha's "birthday".

The latter part of 2005 and early 2006 saw several new features added to the site. Among these was a peer review process, implemented on September 21, 2005, in response to questions about the process by which articles become featured. On November 20 of that year, Memory Alpha began a "Babel" program, inspired by and modeled after that of the Wikimedia Commons, to help users who speak the same language. Other recent innovations include an area for user projects, sometimes referred to as WikiProjects on other wikis, and coverage of fan films.

It is a resource used by mainstream journalists for information on Star Trek related issues. Blogger Will Richardson hailed the site in his 2006 book Blogs, Wikis, Podcasts, and Other Powerful Web Tools for Classrooms as "one of the most impressive [wikis] out there".

On June 12, 2007, Memory Alpha reached a milestone of 25,000 articles with the creation of the article Robert Iscove.

Entertainment Weekly named Memory Alpha one of the 25 Essential Fansites in 2007. In comparing it to other Star Trek sites, the reviewer wrote, "Memory Alpha wins out for its handsome, intuitive presentation and its overwhelming mass".

In April 2016 it became public knowledge that actor and writer for Star Trek Beyond, Simon Pegg, used Memory Alpha as a canon resource in writing of the film, even asking the community's then-inactive founders to name and give etymology for a device in the film.

On November 19, 2020, Memory Alpha reached a milestone of 50,000 articles with the creation of the article "metal fabric" (Metallic fiber).

Structure

Several aspects of Memory Alpha set it apart from other reference works, such as its method of citing sources. All information must be cited from a valid source (see Canon section below), but rather than a "Works Cited" or "References" list, Memory Alpha prefers stand-alone inline citations, which are placed in parentheses after the sentence or section in question. For television episodes, this consists of an abbreviation for the series from which the information came (e.g. DS9 for Star Trek: Deep Space Nine), followed by the name of the episode in double quotation marks. So, to cite information from the Star Trek: The Next Generation (TNG) pilot "Encounter at Farpoint", one would add: (TNG: "Encounter at Farpoint"). The same rule applies for films, without the series prefix and with italics in place of quotation marks. The same method of notation is also used in the printed Star Trek Encyclopedia, which is unrelated to the Memory Alpha wiki.

Articles on Memory Alpha are written from two points of view: "in-universe", which are written as if the reader is a part of the Star Trek universe, and "production", which speak from a real-world perspective. For "in-universe" articles, behind-the-scenes information is not included in the main body of the article; rather, it is placed in a separate background section or included indented and italicized to separate it from the in-universe perspective. The latter method is used in cases where either the information is particularly important (such as conflicting information from two canonical sources) or there is not enough background to justify a separate section. In most cases, the background method is preferred and italics are used sparingly.

Like many wikis, Memory Alpha has a section for "featured articles", those believed to represent the best the community has to offer. The criteria for this distinction are that an article must be well written, comprehensive (which includes citing sources), accurate and undisputed – criteria any article could hypothetically fulfill. This has caused some conflict over the criteria involved (see Current issues section). To be featured, an article must be nominated by a user and unanimously supported by at least five other users; any objections must be fixable and may be invalidated if deemed irrational or unreasonable. Each week, one of the site's featured articles becomes the "Article of the Week" to be displayed on the project home page.

Several methods of communication are available beyond conventional talk pages. The "community portal" section of the website is named after Ten Forward, a locale frequented by characters on The Next Generation. Issues discussed there range from disputes between users to new ideas on how to improve the site to upcoming projects. A separate area, the reference desk, exists for discussions and questions related to what is considered part of the canon, discrepancies between sources, and other such topics. However, "meta-Trek" topics (a term used for Star Trek-related topics that do not pertain in any way to Memory Alpha) are not discussed on the wiki; a separate Discord channel exists for these discussions.

Canon policy
The question of canonicity is a complex one and has plagued fans since Star Trek began in 1966. The general policy of Paramount Pictures is that anything outside live-action television episodes and films is apocryphal, or non-canonical. However, grey areas in this policy, especially in relation to the canonical status of Star Trek: The Animated Series (TAS) and the addition of Star Trek: Lower Decks and Star Trek: Prodigy to the Star Trek universe, further complicate the matter and have led to many debates among fans. In light of this, Memory Alpha crafted its own unique definition of canon in relation to what may be used as a "valid resource". The Animated Series is included as valid, or canonical, for a number of reasons, such as the fact that Star Trek creator Gene Roddenberry and most of the cast of the original series were involved with it and the existence of several references to TAS events in later series.

Information taken from the Star Trek Encyclopedia and Star Trek Chronology is mostly accepted on Memory Alpha as well, to the extent that it does not break from established on-screen facts. Content from these sources is an acknowledged grey area of Memory Alpha's canon policy and is disregarded if deemed speculative or contradictory. Thus, in some ways they hold the same weight as novels and other publications do for Star Wars canon: a "second tier" of canonicity, which is subservient to primary (on-screen) sources.

Other sources such as books and computer games are not included as canonical, but are covered by Memory Alpha in a way which sets it apart from other Trek resources: books, comics, and other products are included as articles about the products (i.e. from a "production point of view"), but "in-universe" information unique or new to them is covered on the product page. For example, in the Star Trek: New Frontier line of books, a new host of characters is introduced to the Trek universe, and their vessel is known as the USS Excalibur. The characters, ships and information from New Frontier books do not receive pages of their own, but they are covered on the pages about the books. In this way, Memory Alpha remains all-inclusive while attempting to distinguish the canon from apocryphal material.

Non-canonical characters and topics are instead covered at "Memory Beta", and fan-films and other fan-created material at "Star Trek Expanded Universe"; both are hosted by Fandom.

Licensing
The contents of Memory Alpha are licensed under the Creative Commons Attribution-Non-Commercial (CC BY-NC) license. Because this license does not allow commercial reuse, it is incompatible with the GNU Free Documentation License (GFDL) and with the Creative Commons Attribution-ShareAlike license (CC BY-SA), and material from the site cannot be copied into projects that use the GFDL or CC BY-SA. This distinction makes Memory Alpha a "sister project" of the primarily CC BY-SA based (formerly GFDL-based) Fandom project. Memory Alpha is cited as a source by academic journals, scholarly studies and books as well as Star Trek-universe novels and reference works.

See also
 List of online encyclopedias

Notes

References

External links
 
 Memory Beta
 Star Trek Expanded Universe

Internet properties established in 2003
Science fiction websites
Star Trek fandom
Fandom (website) wikis